The Lancer 28T Mark V, or Mark 5, is an American trailerable sailboat that was designed by W. Shad Turner as a cruiser and first built in 1982.

Production
The design was built by Lancer Yachts in the United States, starting in 1982, but it is now out of production.

Design
The Lancer 28T Mark V is a recreational keelboat, built predominantly of fiberglass, with wood trim. It has a fractional sloop rig, a raked stem, a slightly angled transom, an internally mounted spade-type/ rudder controlled by a wheel or a tiller and a fixed fin keel. It displaces  and carries  of ballast.

The design has sleeping accommodation for four people, with a straight settee in the main cabin, a drop-down dinette table and an aft cabin with two single berths. The galley is located on both sides just forward of the companionway ladder. The galley is equipped with a two-burner stove to port and a sink to starboard. The head is located just aft of the bow storage area and includes a sink.

See also
List of sailing boat types

References

External links
Photo of a Lancer 28T Mark V

Keelboats
1980s sailboat type designs
Sailing yachts
Trailer sailers
Sailboat type designs by W. Shad Turner
Sailboat types built by Lancer Yachts